Douglas Galvão Silva (born May 21, 1986 in Brasília), known as Douglas Pitbull or just Douglas, is a Brazilian striker. He currently plays for Clube Atlético Linense.

Made professional debut for Goiás in a 1-3 defeat away to Flamengo in the Campeonato Brasileiro on August 26, 2007.

Contract
13 December 2005 to 31 January 2008

References

External links 

 CBF
 goiasesporteclube
 Guardian Stats Centre

1986 births
Living people
Brazilian footballers
Goiás Esporte Clube players
Ituano FC players
Association football forwards
Footballers from Brasília